The NBA high school draftees are players who have been drafted to the National Basketball Association (NBA) straight out of high school. The process of jumping directly from high school to the professional level is also known as going prep-to-pro. Since 2006, the practice of drafting high school players has been prohibited by the new collective bargaining agreement, which requires that players who enter the draft be 19 years of age or older and at least one year removed from high school.

The NBA has long had a preference for players who played college basketball; the vast majority of players to play in the NBA attended college beforehand.

History

Early years
In the early years of the NBA draft, a player had to finish his four-year college eligibility to be eligible for selection. Reggie Harding, who had graduated from high school but did not enroll in a college, became the first player drafted out of high school when the Detroit Pistons selected him in the fourth round of the 1962 draft. However, the NBA rules at that time prohibited a high school player to play in the league until one year after his high school class graduated. Thus, he spent a year playing in a minor league before he was re-drafted in the 1963 draft by the Pistons. He finally entered the league in the 1963–64 season and played four seasons in the NBA and American Basketball Association (ABA).

In 1971, the U.S. Supreme Court decision Haywood v. National Basketball Association ruled against the NBA's requirement that a player must wait four years after high school graduation (which in most cases was spent playing in college) before turning professional. This ruling allowed players to enter the NBA draft without waiting four years, provided they could give evidence of hardship to the NBA office. The NBA's rival, the ABA,  had already instituted a hardship exemption in 1969. 

Moses Malone was the first to play professionally directly out of high school in 1974, though with an ABA team before the merger of that association with the NBA. Two high school players, Darryl Dawkins and Bill Willoughby, applied for hardship and were declared eligible for the 1975 draft. They had applied and gave evidence of financial hardship to the league, which granted them the right to start earning a living by starting their professional careers earlier. Dawkins was selected 5th by the Philadelphia 76ers while Willoughby was selected 19th by the Atlanta Hawks. Dawkins played 14 seasons and averaged 12 points and 6 rebounds per game. Willoughby played 8 seasons with 6 different teams and averaged only 6 points per game. Neither player reached the level of success that was expected. It is argued that they could have been better players if they had college basketball experience before entering the NBA.

After Dawkins and Willoughby, no high schoolers were drafted for 14 years, though several players entered the league without playing college basketball. One player, Shawn Kemp, enrolled in college but never played any games due to personal problems. In 1989, a year after his high school graduation, he was drafted by the Seattle SuperSonics. He played 14 seasons in the NBA and was selected to 6 All-Star Games and 3 All-NBA Teams.

1995–2005

In 1995, Kevin Garnett, USA Today'''s high school basketball player of the year, announced his intentions to forgo college, and declared himself eligible for the 1995 NBA draft. The move was highly controversial; the conventional wisdom at the time was that high-schoolers were neither emotionally nor physically mature enough for the rigors of the NBA game. On draft day, Garnett was selected with the #5 pick in the first round by the Minnesota Timberwolves.  Garnett led the Timberwolves to eight consecutive playoff berths and was a multiple All-Star during his time with the team.  In 2004, the Wolves advanced to the Western Conference Finals before losing to the Lakers; Garnett was named Most Valuable Player that year. After a trade in the 2007 offseason to the Boston Celtics, he was a core player in the Celtics' first NBA title in over 20 years.

In 1996, two notable players made the jump from high school to the NBA.  The first was Kobe Bryant, selected by the Charlotte Hornets with the 13th pick of the NBA draft, but traded almost immediately to the Los Angeles Lakers.  The second was Jermaine O'Neal, selected by the Trail Blazers with the 17th pick.  O'Neal was traded in 2000 to the Indiana Pacers (and later to the Miami Heat).  In 1997, another All-Star caliber player, Tracy McGrady, was selected by the Toronto Raptors.  In 1998, three high-schoolers were drafted with Al Harrington and Rashard Lewis experiencing the most success. Darius Miles became the highest high school player selected with the third pick in the 2000 NBA Draft, until the following year.

2005–2020
Beginning 2005, both the NBA and the players' union started to discuss the possibility of implementing a new age requirement. The league lobbied for an age minimum of 20 while the union was against an age requirement. Finally in July 2005, both sides compromised in the new collective bargaining agreement, requiring that the minimum age for entry into the NBA be 19 and that entrants be at least one year removed from high school. 

Some players support the new age limit. Gerald Green called it "a smart move", saying that "[not everybody is] LeBron James ... He came in ready and he dominated the league. There's a lot of players that have to get developed. Me, I've got to get developed. But I guess that age limit, that one year of college experience, can get you more developed and I think that's pretty good." Others, however, strongly criticize the rule. Andrew Bynum said "That's something I'll never understand. Because in no other business can the owner, or a stock trader, or a CEO of a company try to protect themselves by putting rules like that." Former Florida Gators and current Chicago Bulls head coach Billy Donovan believed that the rule made high schoolers feel like they were being punished. Spencer Haywood, the plaintiff in the Haywood v. National Basketball Association'' decision, supported an age limit of 20, allowing players time to mature. He left college after his sophomore season to play in the ABA.

List
There have been 41 high school draftees in the NBA draft. Three draftees were selected first overall; Kwame Brown in 2001 NBA draft, LeBron James in 2003, and Dwight Howard in 2004 NBA draft. Two draftees went on to win the Rookie of the Year Award in their first season: LeBron James and 2002 draftee Amar'e Stoudemire. Ten draftees have been selected to the All-Star Game and ten draftees have been selected to the All-NBA Team.

Controversy

Despite the success of some high school players drafted, the entry of high school players into the NBA remains controversial. Critics say that high school players are not mentally and physically mature or prepared enough to handle the pressure of professional play. Thus, they are more likely to fail. Instead, they believe that colleges are useful at filtering out players who can dominate against weak competition in high school, but cannot succeed at a higher level of play. They also think that the influx of high schoolers bypassing colleges in favor of the NBA has caused collegiate game to deteriorate. Universities are wary of spending time recruiting, as many players are financially motivated to turn pro fresh out of high school.

On the other hand, proponents argue that there is no valid reason to exclude high school players. Michael McCann, writer of law article "Illegal Defense: The Irrational Economics of Banning High School Players from the NBA Draft", contends that players drafted straight out of high school can do as well as any other players in the NBA. The article finds that "on average, these [high school] players perform better in every major statistical category than does the average NBA player". Others instead believe that the problem was due to the lack of established farm system in basketball until recently. In other major sports, such as baseball and hockey, it is common for young players to develop in their minor league systems.

See also
Eligibility for the NBA draft

Notes

 Each year is linked to an article about that particular NBA Draft.
 Year denotes the year when the player graduated from high school.
 Debut denotes the year when the player made his NBA debut. Each year is linked to an article about that particular NBA season.
 Information not available

References

External links
NBA.com
NBA.com: NBA Draft History

National Basketball Association draft
National Basketball Association lists
National Basketball Association controversies